Treuchtlingen is a town in the Weißenburg-Gunzenhausen district, in Bavaria, Germany. It has a population of around 12,000.

History
The spot where the town is situated was first settled by Celts, Romans and Franks. The town proper was founded in 793, during the reign of Charlemagne, and it was first mentioned in 899, as Drutelinga. In the 12th century the castle was erected. In 1495 Treuchtlingen was burnt down. In 1869 the train station was opened.

On 23 February 1945 at 11:00 clock an air raid on the station Treuchtlingen (Operation Clarion) took place, in which the Fronturlauberzug SF 2046 just stopped. The passengers of the train fled into the platform underpass, which received a direct hit.300 people died in the platform underpass, a total of nearly 600 people were killed and another 900 injured in the station and the surrounding area. Most of the bomb victims are buried in the memorial site of Kriegsgräberfürsorge on the Nagelberg. In the underpass, which tunneled the tracks elsewhere since a station renovation in 2004, a marble plaque commemorates the victims. In a second attack on April 11, 1945, no people were killed, but among other things, a steam locomotive type Bayerische G 3/4 H destroyed. Part of the wreck was found in the course of the reconstruction and is now in the Bavarian Railway Museum in Nördlingen.

Geography

Location
Treuchtlingen is situated on the river Altmühl, 9 km southwest of Weißenburg in Bayern, and 45 km northeast of Donauwörth.

Since it is located on the European Watershed between Rhine and Danube, the municipal territory is the site of the remains of Fossa Carolina, an early Medieval attempt to bridge the watershed.

Subdivisions
In addition to the town itself, the municipality of Treuchtlingen today includes 53 hamlets and villages. The municipal territory is divided into 12 Ortsteile (including the town) and several hamlets:

Government

Mayors
 Friedrich Grahl, 1894–1907	
 Jacob	Aurnhammer, 1888-1894 and 1907-1909	
 Ludwig Staudinger, 1909–1912
 Karl Kraft, 1912–1918
 Emil Otto Sommer, 1918–1933	
 Andreas Güntner, 1933–1945
 Friedrich Korn, 1946–1956
 Hans Döbler, 1956–1984
 Wolfgang Herrmann (CSU), 1984–2008
 Werner Baum jun. (SPD), 2008–2020
 Kristina Becker (CSU), since 1 May 2020

Transport 

Treuchtlingen is the initial point of the Treuchtlingen-Würzburg railway.

Twin towns – sister cities

Treuchtlingen is twinned with:
 Bonyhád, Hungary
 Ponsacco, Italy

Photogallery

Notable people

Gottfried Heinrich Graf zu Pappenheim (1594-1632), field marshal of the Holy Roman Emperor, during the Thirty Years' War commander of a cavalry regiment in the service of the League and the Habsburg Emperor.
Albert Stöckl (1823-1895), priest and theologian, professor and Reichstag deputy for the Centre Party (Germany)
Elkan Naumburg (1835-1924), German-American banker, philanthropist and musicologist
 (born 1946), writer
 Joachim Grzega (born 1971), linguist
 Sebastian Glasner (born 1985), soccer player

Bibliography
 Daniel Burger/Birgit Friedel: Burgen und Schlösser in Mittelfranken; ars vivendi verlag: Cadolzburg 2003; S. 125-128; .
 Werner Somplatzki: Kirchen in Altmühlfranken; (Reihe Gelbe Taschenbuch-Führer); wek-Verlag: Treuchtlingen 1990; ; hier: S. 70-73 u. 76-85.
 Walter E. Keller: Treuchtlingen; (Reihe Gelbe Taschenbuch-Führer); wek-Verlag: Treuchtlingen/Berlin 2006; .
 Walter E. Keller (Hrsg.): Das Dorf Schambach; wek-Verlag: Treuchtlingen 2002; .
 Gotthard Kießling: Landkreis Weißenburg-Gunzenhausen. (Denkmäler in Bayern, V 70/1); Munich 2000; .

References

External links

 
 History of Treuchtlingen's coat of arms at HdBG

Weißenburg-Gunzenhausen